The Yates Formation is a geologic formation in southeast New Mexico and west Texas. It preserves fossils dating back to the late Guadalupian Age of the Permian period.

Description

The formation consists of sandstone, siltstone, and anhydrite. The sandstone is fine to very fine grained and contains scattered large rounded and frosted quartz grains. The formation overlies the Seven Rivers Formation and underlies the Tansill Formation.

History of investigation
The unit was first identified in the subsurface at the Yates oil field of west Texas. It was first traced to surface outcrops in the Carlsbad, New Mexico area in 1938 and assigned as a member of the (now abandoned) Whitehorse Formation. Dickey raised the unit to formation rank in 1940, when the Whitehorse was raised to group rank. The unit was reassigned to the Artesia Group in 1962.

See also

 List of fossiliferous stratigraphic units in New Mexico
 Paleontology in New Mexico

Footnotes

References
 
 
 
 

Permian formations of New Mexico